Nasal vestibulitis is the diffuse dermatitis of nasal vestibule.  It is often caused by Staphylococcus aureus. It may be secondary to chronic rhinorrhea, nose picking or viral infections.  In acute vestibulitis, the skin is red, swollen and tender. In chronic vestibulitis, induration of vestibular skin and crusting is seen. Antibiotic steroid ointment is sometimes helpful. Chronic fissures can be cauterized with Silver Nitrate.

References

Nose disorders